Sen Fujimoto  was a Japanese novelist. She was best known for her Edogawa Rampo Prize-winning work .

Biography 
Fujimoto was born in Tokyo on February 15, 1923. She graduated from Nihon University. Her 1976  was nominated for the Naoki Prize, but did not win it. Her later novel  won the Edogawa Rampo Prize in 1977.

Fujimoto moved to Germany in 1986. She went to France in 1989, and after that she became untraceable.

Selected works 

 , 1966
 , 1976
 , 1977

References 

1923 births
Writers from Tokyo
Nihon University alumni
20th-century Japanese novelists
Edogawa Rampo Prize winners